Zbigniew E. Szafrański is a Polish Egyptologist.

Life
Zbigniew Szafrański is the director of the Polish archeological mission to Egypt that has been working at Queen Hatshepsut's mortuary temple since 1961. He is known as the founder of the Polish school of Mediterranean Archaeology. He is a faculty member at the University of Warsaw, Department of History, and is deputy chief of the Mediterranean Archaeology Center. He has published numerous papers and writes on Egyptian history for popular magazines.

See also
List of Egyptologists
List of Poles

References

Polish Egyptologists
20th-century Polish archaeologists
Polish social scientists
Academic staff of the University of Warsaw
Year of birth missing (living people)
Living people
21st-century Polish archaeologists